The United States H-class submarines were Holland 602 type submarines used by the United States Navy.

They were commissioned in December 1913/January 1914.

In 1915 the Imperial Russian Navy had ordered 17 H-class submarines from the Electric Boat Company, to be built in Canada at a temporary shipyard near Barnet, Vancouver, British Columbia to avoid US neutrality concerns, which had derailed the delivery of ten similar submarines to the British. The shipyard was owned by the British Pacific Construction and Engineering Co. Eleven were delivered, and served as the American Holland-class submarines, but the shipment of the final six was held up pending the outcome of the Russian Revolution of 1917, and the boats were stored in knockdown condition at their construction yard. All six were purchased by the United States Navy on 20 May 1918 and assembled at Puget Sound Navy Yard before being commissioned as H-4 to H-9 in late 1918.

 ran aground and was wrecked off the coast of Mexico on 12 March 1920, while the remaining eight submarines were decommissioned in late 1922, and laid up in the Reserve Fleet. Finally stricken from the Navy List in 1930, they were sold for scrap in 1931 and 1933.

Design
These vessels included some features intended to increase underwater speed that were standard on US submarines of this era, including a small sail and a rotating cap over the torpedo tube muzzles. For extended surface runs, the small sail was augmented with a temporary piping-and-canvas structure (see photo). Apparently the "crash dive" concept had not yet been thought of, as this would take considerable time to deploy and dismantle. This remained standard through the N class, commissioned 1917-1918. Experience in World War I showed that this was inadequate in the North Atlantic weather, and earlier submarines serving overseas in that war (E class through L class) had their bridge structures augmented with a "chariot" shield on the front of the bridge. Starting with the N class, built with lessons learned from overseas experience, US submarines had bridges more suited to surfaced operations in rough weather. The streamlined, rotating torpedo tube muzzle cap eliminated the drag that muzzle holes would otherwise cause. In the stowed position, the submarine appears to have no torpedo tubes, as the holes in the cap are covered by the bow stem.  This feature remained standard through the K class, after which it was replaced with shutters that were standard through the 1950s.

Boats
  (originally Seawolf), laid down 22 March 1911, launched 6 May 1913, commissioned 1 December 1913. Wrecked, 12 March 1920.
  (originally Nautilus), laid down 23 March 1911, launched 4 June 1913, commissioned 1 December 1913. Decommissioned, 23 October 1922, sold for scrap 1 September 1931.
  (originally Garfish), laid down 3 April 1911, launched 3 July 1913, commissioned 16 January 1914. Decommissioned, 23 October 1922, sold for scrap 14 September 1931.
 , laid down 12 May 1918, launched 9 October 1918, commissioned 24 October 1918. Decommissioned, 25 October 1922, sold for scrap 14 September 1931.
 , laid down 12 May 1918, launched 24 September 1918, commissioned 30 September 1918. Decommissioned, 20 October 1922, sold for scrap 28 November 1933.
 , laid down 14 May 1918, launched 26 August 1918, commissioned 9 September 1918. Decommissioned, 23 October 1922, sold for scrap 28 November 1933.
 , laid down 15 May 1918, launched 17 October 1918, commissioned 24 October 1918. Decommissioned, 23 October 1922, sold for scrap 28 November 1933.
 , laid down 25 May 1918, launched 14 November 1918, commissioned 18 November 1918. Decommissioned, 17 November 1922, sold for scrap 28 November 1933.
 , laid down 1 June 1918, launched 23 November 1918, commissioned 25 November 1918. Decommissioned, 3 November 1922, sold for scrap 28 November 1933.

See also
 American Holland-class submarine

References

Notes

Sources
 Gardiner, Robert, Conway's All the World's Fighting Ships 1906–1921 Conway Maritime Press, 1985. .
 Friedman, Norman "US Submarines through 1945: An Illustrated Design History", Naval Institute Press, Annapolis:1995, .
Navsource.org early diesel submarines page
Pigboats.com H-boats page
 The Legend of Electric Boat, by Jeffrey L. Rodengen, 1994 
 Britain's Clandestine Submarines 1914-1915, by Gaddis Smith, 1964, . 
 The Subterfuge Submarines, by E. C. Fischer jr., in Warship International, 1977 Vol. XIV No.3
 Building Submarines for Russia in Burrard Inlet, by W. Kaye Lamb, in BC Studies'' No.71 Autumn, 1986

External links

Submarine classes
 
 H class